Qwara, or Qwareña (called "Falasha" (Hwarasa) in some older sources), was one of two Agaw dialects, spoken by a subgroup of the Beta Israel (Ethiopian Jews) of the Qwara area. It is a dialect of Qimant. It is nearly extinct. Several early Falashan manuscripts, using the Ge'ez alphabet, exist; in more recent times, the language has been recorded by several linguists and travellers, starting with Flad in 1866.

The language was on the decline in the early 20th  century, as it was being replaced by Amharic. During Operation Solomon, most of its remaining speakers were airlifted to Israel, where it continues to lose ground to Hebrew.

See also
Kayla dialect

References

Further reading

Flad, J. M. (1866). A Short Description of the Falasha and Kamants in Abyssinia: Together with an Outline of the Elements and a Vocabulary of the Falasha Language. Mission Press.
Freeburg, E. (2013). The Cost of Revival: the Role of Hebrew in Jewish Language Endangerment (Doctoral dissertation, Yale University).

External links
Endangered Languages Profile for Hwarasa
SIL – Sociolinguist report of the Kemant (Qimant) Language of Ethiopia
Qwara language map

Jewish languages
Jews and Judaism in Ethiopia
Languages of Ethiopia
Central Cushitic languages
Endangered Afroasiatic languages
Endangered languages of Africa